Atrax (or Ἄτραγϕϛ or Ἄτρακοϛ) or Atracia (Ἀτρακία) was a Perrhaebian town in ancient Thessaly, described by Livy as situated above the river Peneius, at the distance of about  from Larissa. Strabo says that the Peneius passed by the cities of Tricca, Pelinnaeum and Pharcadon, on its left, on its course to Atrax and Larissa. The town is attested as Ἆδρακος in the nominative in a catalog of theorodokoi of Epidaurus, dating from 363-359 BCE. It was also a polis (city-state) in antiquity.

History
The town was located in the district of Pelasgiotis and its territory was bordered on the north by Phalanna, the northeast by Argura, and to the south by Crannon.

In the 5th century BCE, the acropolis and the slope of the hill were enclosed in a polygonal enclosure. In the 4th century BCE the acropolis was rebuilt: a quadrangular tower was built and fortified with a new wall with five towers, one of them with a fortified gate. The eastern part of the wall of the hill was reinforced in the 4th century BCE, And bears similarity to the defensive constructions of Halos. The lower part was enclosed in the 4th century BCE by an opus isodomum wall with four quadrangular towers. The main gate was in the northwest, and was accessed by a polygonal stone ramp.

During the food crisis of 330-326 BCE Atrax received 10,000 medimnoi of wheat from Cyrene, in Africa.

Atrax minted silver and bronze coins at the beginning of the 4th century BCE, With the legends «ΑΤΡΑ», «ΑΤΡΑΓΙΟΝ», and «ΑΤΡΑΓΙΩΝ».

Location
Modern scholars locate Atrax at a kastro called Alifaka in the modern village of Koutsochero, in the municipal unit of Koilada, in the municipality of Larissa.

References

Populated places in ancient Thessaly
Former populated places in Greece
Pelasgiotis
Larissa (regional unit)
Perrhaebia
Thessalian city-states